USS Mahan (DD-102) was a  built for the United States Navy. Commissioned in 1918, Mahan was a flush deck destroyer, and the first ship to be named for Rear Admiral Alfred Thayer Mahan. Her main battery consisted of four 4-inch/50 caliber guns.

Background 
Norman Friedman, a naval historian, observed in U.S. Destroyers that the First World War ushered in a new aspect for American destroyer design; e.g. a significant need for a large number of ships. Specifically designed for speeds to match those of the fleet's new era of battlecruiser. The ships would also be designed as a modified version of the 1916 Caldwell class destroyer.

Design

General characteristics
USS Mahan (DD-102) was a Wickes-class destroyer built for the United States Navy by the Fore River Shipyard, Quincy, Massachusetts. The ship was named for Rear Admiral Alfred Thayer Mahan and laid down on 4 May 1918. She was launched on 4 August 1918, and sponsored by Miss Ellen K. Mahan, niece of Rear Admiral Mahan. The ship was commissioned on 24 October 1918 – less than one month prior to the end of the First World War. Mahan was decommissioned on 1 May 1920. 

Mahan was built with a flush deck; meaning she was designed without a raised forecastle. Mahan displaced 1,060 tons at the standard load. The ship's complement was 133 officers and enlisted men.

Machinery and armament

Service history
After her shakedown cruise, Mahan operated off Cuba until May 1919.  She then steamed to the Azores to become one of the guide ships for the transatlantic flights of the Navy flying boats: NC-1, NC-3, and NC-4. Mahan returned to Boston, Massachusetts, via Brest, France, on 21 June. She was converted into a light minelayer on 17 July 1920 and designated as DM-7.

With the exception of a cruise to Pearl Harbor for maneuvers in early 1925, Mahan operated along the United States East Coast, in the Caribbean Sea, and off the Panama Canal Zone for the next 10 years. During this time, the destroyer participated in fleet training exercises, and patrolled courses for the International Six Meter Sailing Races of 1922 and 1927. Mahan conducted reserve-training cruises in the Caribbean Sea from 1928 to September 1929. Throughout the decade, in addition to her regular duties, Mahan served as an experimental ship testing new equipment for the Navy's future use.

Fiction
USS Mahan was used in the Destroyermen series, written by Taylor Anderson. In the books, Mahan and her sister ship  are pursued by superior Japanese naval forces after the Battle of the Java Sea and seek refuge in a squall. The squall transports Mahan and Walker to an alternate earth, one where a different evolutionary path occurred. Anderson also uses other decommissioned and never-completed ships in the series: the U.S. Navy submarine  and the Imperial Japanese Navy battlecruiser Amagi.

References

Footnotes

Citations

Bibliography

External links
 NavSource Photos
 History of 'USS Mahan-named ships
 

Wickes-class destroyers
World War I destroyers of the United States
Ships built in Quincy, Massachusetts
1918 ships
Wickes-class destroyer minelayers